The W. H. Everhardt House, at 1223 College St. in Bowling Green, Kentucky, was built in 1879.  It was listed on the National Register of Historic Places in 1979.

It is Italianate in style.

References

National Register of Historic Places in Bowling Green, Kentucky
Italianate architecture in Kentucky
Houses completed in 1879
Houses in Warren County, Kentucky
Houses on the National Register of Historic Places in Kentucky
1879 establishments in Kentucky